Anthony Suter is an American composer and music educator.
Dr. Suter has a deep interest in mentoring younger musicians and is a vocal advocate for public school music programs, often serving as a guest conductor and clinician for K-12 music programs.
He resides in Redlands, California, just outside Los Angeles.

Dr. Suter's music has been heard in nearly every major U.S. city, as well as a growing list of international venues. Dr. Suter joined the University of Redlands faculty in the Fall of 2008, where he teaches composition and music theory. He earned his B.M. in Music Theory and Composition from the University of Southern California, his M.M. in Music Composition from the University of Michigan, and his D.M.A. from the University of Texas at Austin.

His works include three chamber operas, chamber and orchestral music, and several works for wind ensemble. Upcoming projects include Sex Sting, a collaborative electro-acoustic opera with playwright Doris Baizley and the electronic music duo MLuM (Marco Schindelmann and Michael Raco-Rands), as well as a new choral work for the University of Redlands Madrigals group (Nicholle Andrews, director). Recent projects have included works for the Virginia Arts Festival Duffy Opera Workshop, the NYC-based NOW Ensemble, and percussionist Stephen A. Martin.

In 2009, Centaur Records released the CD Hymns to Forgotten Moons: The Music of Arnold Schoenberg and Anthony Suter, which features two works by Suter.

Awards
Dr. Suter’s music has received awards from the National Opera Association, the College Band Director's National Association, ASCAP, Associazione Culturale Musicale "Euritmia", the British and International Bass Forum, Concorso 2 Agosto, and the Texas String Project. His music is published by Daehn Publications and Edizione Musicale “Wicky” (Milan).

References

External links

Living people
American male composers
21st-century American composers
University of Texas at Austin College of Fine Arts alumni
USC Thornton School of Music alumni
University of Michigan School of Music, Theatre & Dance alumni
American music educators
21st-century American male musicians
Year of birth missing (living people)